138P/Shoemaker–Levy, also known as Shoemaker–Levy 7, is a faint periodic comet in the Solar System. The comet last came to perihelion on 11 June 2012, but only brightened to about apparent magnitude 20.5.

There were 4 recovery images of 138P on 8 August 2018 by Pan-STARRS when the comet had a magnitude of about 21.5. The comet comes to perihelion on 2 May 2019.

This comet should not be confused with Comet Shoemaker–Levy 9 (D/1993 F2), which crashed into Jupiter in 1994.

References

External links 
 Orbital simulation from JPL (Java) / Horizons Ephemeris
 138P/Shoemaker-Levy 7 – Seiichi Yoshida @ aerith.net
 Elements and Ephemeris for 138P/Shoemaker-Levy – Minor Planet Center
 138P at Kronk's Cometography

Periodic comets
0138
138P
138P
138P
Comets in 2012
Comets in 2019
19911113